Deh Shams-e Bozorg is a village in Oshnavieh-ye Jonubi Rural District of Nalus District of Oshnavieh County, West Azerbaijan province, Iran. At the 2006 National Census, its population was 767 in 126 households. The following census in 2011 counted 819 people in 241 households. The latest census in 2016 showed a population of 779 people in 225 households; it was the largest village in its rural district.

References 

Oshnavieh County

Populated places in West Azerbaijan Province

Populated places in Oshnavieh County